Shamsi Hekmat or Šamsi Morādpur Hekmat (1917 – July 2, 1997) was an Iranian woman who pioneered reforms in women's status in Iran. She founded the first Iranian Jewish women's organization (Sāzmān-e bānovān-e Yahud-e Irān) in 1947. She migrated to the United States and established the Iranian Jewish Women's Organization of Southern California to help poor families and students.

Biography
Hekmat was born in Tehran in 1917. After her studies at the American School, she did her graduation from the Sage College in Tehran. She founded the Hekmat International School (1950–79) in Tehran, was its principal and owner. In 1947, Hekmat's student Parvin Hakim, who founded the Bashgah-e khaharan, had requested Hekmat to establish a Jewish women's organization to create awareness among Jewish women in specified disciplines. As a result, along with  nine others, Hekmat founded the Jewish Ladies' Organization of Iran  (Sāzmān-e bānovān-e Yahud-e Irān; 1947–79). Under the auspices of this organization five daycare centres became operational in poor Jewish settlements in various parts of the country; these centres provided free "education, clothing, food, and shelter" to poor children. The organization also promoted education of grown up people and their vocational training, and extended assistance during natural calamities. Hekmat called this organization as a "miracle or a revolution in the social life of Iranian Jewish women".
As a member of central committee of the Women's Organization of Iran (WOI) (which had been established by Shah of Iran in 1966), she was instrumental in getting for Jewish women their inheritance rights in the community. She also spoke  at the United States Jewish Association in USA. She also attended, as a representative  of the Jewish community, the conference of the U.N. Commission on the Status of Women in Tehran.

Following the Iranian Revolution she migrated to the United States in 1979.  She was not happy in leaving as she said "For the first two years in the United States I practically didn't leave the house. I was very unhappy. I had not wanted to leave". Nevertheless, she was grateful for the freedom that the U.S. provided. In fact, declassified documents reveal that she was the one woman among a delegation of 10 Iranians to the White House who facilitated a solution to stop President Carter's executive order to deport Iranians. In the US she established the Iranian Jewish Women's Organization of Southern California which provided financial assistance to poor people and students. Her other notable activities are related to: Starting of the "Persian Friends Chapter of the City of Hope" in 1981 as a fund raising movement to help the City of Hope Medical Center; creating the "Haifa Group" of the Beverly Hills Chapter of Hadassah in 1982. For these contributions, in 1989,  she was awarded the Honorary Life President of Hadassah.

References

Sources

Further reading
 

1917 births
1997 deaths
Iranian Jews
Jewish activists
People from Tehran
Exiles of the Iranian Revolution in the United States
Iranian women activists
20th-century Iranian women
American people of Iranian-Jewish descent
Jewish American activists
20th-century Jews
Jewish women activists
City of Hope National Medical Center